Martin Fink  (born 5 February 1950) is a German politician, representative of the Christian Social Union of Bavaria. Since 2008 he has been a member of the Landtag of Bavaria.

See also
List of Bavarian Christian Social Union politicians

References

Christian Social Union in Bavaria politicians
Recipients of the Medal of the Order of Merit of the Federal Republic of Germany
1950 births
Living people